Shooting Straight in the Dark is the third studio album by American country music artist Mary Chapin Carpenter. It was a #11 Country Album on the Billboard Country Albums chart. Four of its tracks became Billboard Hot Country Songs hits: "You Win Again" at #16, "Right Now" at #15, "Down at the Twist and Shout" at #2, and "Going Out Tonight" at #14. Members of the Cajun band BeauSoleil provide guest instrumentation on "Down at the Twist and Shout". Shawn Colvin provided backing vocals on three of the album's songs.

Track listing
All songs written by Mary Chapin Carpenter; except where indicated

"Going Out Tonight" (Carpenter, John Jennings) - 3:16
"Right Now" (Al Lewis, Sylvester Bradford) - 2:36
"The More Things Change" - 3:56
"When She's Gone" - 5:05
"Middle Ground" - 3:51
"Can't Take Love for Granted" - 4:01
"Down at the Twist and Shout" - 3:21
"Halley Came to Jackson" - 3:10
"What You Didn't Say" - 4:36
"You Win Again"  - 3:59
"The Moon and St. Christopher" - 4:21
duet with Shawn Colvin

Personnel
Credits from album liner notes.
Peter Bonta – acoustic guitar on "Down at the Twist and Shout", keyboards on "Can't Take Love for Granted", piano on "Halley Came to Jackson"
Jimmy Breaux – Acadian accordion and Cajun yells on "Down at the Twist and Shout"
Mary Chapin Carpenter – lead and backing vocals, acoustic guitar, producer
Jon Carroll – piano on "Right Now", backing vocals on "The More Things Change"
Shawn Colvin – backing vocals on "Middle Ground", duet vocals on "The Moon and St. Christopher"
Mike Cotter – backing vocals
Don Dixon – bass guitar on "Right Now", backing vocals on "Right Now"
Michael Doucet – fiddle on "Down at the Twist and Shout", Cajun yells on "Down at the Twist and Shout"
John Jennings – electric and acoustic guitars, bass guitar, synthesizer, backing vocals, Cajun yells, producer
Marti Jones – backing vocals on "Right Now" and "Middle Ground"
Robbie Magruder – drums
John McCutcheon – hammer dulcimer on "Halley Came to Jackson"
Mark O'Connor – fiddle on "Halley Came to Jackson"
Dave Palamar – drums on "Right Now"
Herb Pedersen – backing vocals on "Halley Came to Jackson"
Rico Petruccelli – bass guitar
Matt Rollings – piano
Vince Santoro – drums on "Middle Ground"
Billy Ware – percussion on "Down at the Twist and Shout", Cajun yells on "Down at the Twist and Shout"

Chart performance

References

Mary Chapin Carpenter albums
Columbia Records albums
1990 albums